Carlos Alberto Daniel López Puccio (born 9 October 1946 in Rosario, Argentina) is an Argentinian multi-instrumentalist, orchestral and choral conductor, composer, arranger and one of the current members of Les Luthiers.

After graduating from orchestral conducting in La Plata, he was hired by Les Luthiers to play the fiddlecan (a violin made of tuna can), and famously learnt the repertoire in two days (around 1970). For the next season, he started a songwriting partnership with Jorge Maronna, and they penned 'Pieza en Forma de Tango'; he also composed 'Voglio Entrare Per la Finestra' (with libretto by Marcos Mundstock) and around June 1971 he was invited to be a group member rather than a paid collaborator.

During the first years in Les Luthiers, López-Puccio played other instruments such as cello, viola and percussion, and he often provided backing vocals. He also composed all the music for many pieces for the group, including 'Concierto de Mpkstroff' (which features group-mate Carlos Núñez Cortés as soloist) and 'Brotan und Gretchen'. He slowly gained notoriety scripting jokes for his groupmates as well as occasional song lyrics.

From 1979 onwards he also played piano, synthesiser and harmonica for several musical pieces, especially since Ernesto Acher left the group, and they started including electronic keyboards more often. He also became more and more involved as an actor, having several starring parts from the 80's onwards.

Compositions for Les Luthiers
Bolero de Mastropiero (with Maronna).
Cantata del adelantado Don Rodrigo Díaz de Carreras (with Ernesto Acher and Jorge Maronna).
Concierto de Mpkstroff (with some input from Núñez).
Marcha de la conquista (with Maronna & Acher).
Pieza en Forma de Tango (with Maronna).
Serenata Mariachi (with Maronna & Mundstock).
Si no fuera santiagueño (with Acher, Mundstock & Maronna).
Voglio entrare per la finestra (music).

Performances

Backing Vocals:
Añoralgias (post-1986 versions)
Bolero de los celos
Bolero de Mastropiero
Cantata del adelantado Don Rodrigo Díaz de Carreras
Cartas de color
Educación sexual moderna
El explicado
El negro quiere bailar
Fuga en Si-beria
La gallina dijo eureka
La hija de Escipión
La tanda
La vida es hermosa
Lazy Daisy
Marcha de la conquista
Oi Gadóñaya
Romance del joven conde, la sirena y el pájaro cucú. Y la oveja
San Ictícola de los peces
Si no fuera santiagueño
Somos adolescentes mi pequeña
Teorema de Thales
Visita a la universidad de Wildstone
Bass guitar:
Bolero de los celos
Cantata del adelantado Don Rodrigo Díaz de Carreras
Perdónala
Contraguitarrone da gamba (hybrid of viola and acoustic guitar):
Bolero de Mastropiero (1971 version)
drums:
Cartas de color
Manuel Darío
Miss Lilly Higgins sings shimmy in Mississippi's spring (Shimmy)
Pepper Clemens sent the messenger: nevertheless the reverend left the herd (Ten step) (original versions)
Harmonica:
Balada del séptimo regimiento
Cartas de color
Lo que el sheriff se contó
Manuel Darío
Sólo necesitamos
Harmonium:
La tanda
Kazoo:
Concierto de Mpkstroff
El asesino misterioso
Marcha de la conquista
San Ictícola de los peces
Latín (violin made of a tin can):
Canción para moverse
Concierto de Mpkstroff (non-symphonic versions)
Cuarteto op. 44
El beso de Ariadna
Encuentro en el restaurante
Enteteniciencia familiar
Iniciación a las artes marciales
La bella y graciosa moza
La hora de la nostalgia
La vida es hermosa
Para Elisabeth
Pepper Clemens sent the messenger: nevertheless the reverend left the herd (Ten step) (post-Acher versions)
Pieza en forma de tango
Serenata medio oriental
Serenata tímida
Sinfonia interrumpida
Sonatas para latín y piano
Una canción regia
Vea esta noche
Visita a la universidad de Wildstone
Bombo legüero:
El regreso del indio
El valor de la unidad
Latin Percussion:
Cantata del adelantado Don Rodrigo Díaz de Carreras
Lead Vocals:
Bolero de los celos (one verse)
Educación sexual moderna (one verse)
El poeta y el eco (with Jorge Maronna)
El regreso del indio (ending)
El valor de la unidad (part)
La vida es hermosa (part)
Los jóvenes de hoy en día (with Jorge Maronna)
Sólo necesitamos (with Jorge Maronna)
Una canción regia (with Jorge Maronna)
Maracas:
Cartas de color
La redención del vampiro
Piano:
Cantata del adelantado Don Rodrigo Díaz de Carreras (post-Acher versions)
La campana suonerà
Las majas del bergantín ('81 and '86 versions)
Pepper Clemens sent the messenger: nevertheless the reverend left the herd (Ten step) (post-Acher versions)
Special Effects:
El asesino misterioso (shoe-steps, screams)
Synthesizer:
A la playa con Mariana
Daniel y el Señor
El sendero de Warren Sánchez
Fly Airways
Fronteras de la ciencia
Homenaje a Huesito Williams
La hija de Escipión
La hora de la nostalgia
Serenata intimidatoria
Triangle:
El asesino misterioso
Viola:
La princesa caprichosa

References

External links
Short Bio (Spanish)

1946 births
Argentine musicians
Les Luthiers
Musicians from Rosario, Santa Fe
Living people